False Bay Park, a Ramsar site wetland since 2015, is a nature reserve that protects the western shores of the freshwater bay, False Bay, and is situated near the coast of northern KwaZulu-Natal, South Africa. False Bay is connected to Lake St. Lucia and both are included in the iSimangaliso Wetland Park. . It covers 1,500 hectares and is located at 34° 4′ S, 18° 30′ E.

=

Mammals 
Significant populations can be found here of the following mammals: hippopotamus, African clawless otter, marsh mongoose, Cape grysbok, steenbok, Southern African vlei rat (Otomys irroratus), Cape genet (Genetta tigrina}, and Cape gray mongoose.

Birds 
A large variety of bird species can be found here: little stint, ruff, pied avocet, common tern, greater flamingo, and great white pelican.

Gallery

See also 
 Protected areas of South Africa
 iSimangaliso Wetland Park
 Ramsar Convention

References 
 False Bay, KZN Wildlife

Ezemvelo KZN Wildlife Parks